Jacob Two-Two Meets The Hooded Fang is a 1978 film adaptation of Mordecai Richler's children's novel by the same name.  He was a father of five children, with the youngest, Jacob, inspiring his character Jacob Two-Two. The main character is Jacob Two-Two, a young boy who has a habit of repeating himself in order to be heard by those around him.

Significance
Although the original novel began "as a tale told to his youngest son", it is now considered to be a Canadian classic, and inspired future film and television adaptions. A 1999 adaptation of the source material and the popular television series Jacob Two-Two, which aired from 2003 to 2006, followed.

Synopsis
This humorous children's story recounts the adventure of a young boy who strives to be heard. As Toronto Globe and Mail writer James Bradshaw writes, Jacob Two-Two is "two plus two plus two years old, has two brothers and two sisters, and has to say everything twice just to be heard; odd numbers aren't his thing." This quirk gives rise to his nickname "Two-Two". Two-Two's odd habit results in a misunderstanding that lands him in prison.  The prison is guarded by a child-hating, former wrestler named "The Hooded-Fang".  Through his resourcefulness, cunning, and the help of a few friends, the young boy attempts to escape the prison and its monstrous warden.

Plot
The film begins in Jacob Two-Two's home in Montreal. Jacob runs from room to room attempting to convince his older siblings to pay attention to him. His eldest brother, Daniel, tells him to leave him alone, as he is trying to do his homework. When he visits his sister Martha, she is watching wrestling. She tells Jacob he should leave, and that he would only get nightmares from the frightening wrestlers. When he asks Emma and Noah if he can join in on their game of Child Power, they tell him that he is too little to play. When he enters the kitchen, he asks his mother if he can help with dinner, but once again he is told that he is too small. Finally, Jacob visits his father in the living room, where he is reading a newspaper. Jacob expresses his disappointment that he is too small to help and play, and Jacob's father suggests that he travel to the store down the street and buy some chocolate ice cream.

Jacob leaves for the corner store and passes a policeman on his way inside. Inside he sees adults looming over him. He sees a man holding a fish, a woman holding a bird, and a man holding a lollipop. Jacob approaches the store owner, Mr. Cooper, and asks for "two quarts of chocolate ice cream please, two quarts of chocolate ice cream please." Mr. Cooper is taken aback by Jacob's odd behaviour and begins to tease the boy. The policeman enters the store and joins in on the fun. Mr. Cooper demands that Jacob be charged with insulting an adult. The policeman agrees and pulls out his pad of paper, pretending to write the charge down. Jacob panics and runs from the store. The policeman runs after him and tries to explain that he and Mr. Cooper were only joking, but Jacob is already too far away. Jacob runs to a park and hides under a pile of fallen leaves, where he eventually falls asleep.

When Jacob wakes up, he is in a jail cell. The policeman from the store comes into the cell and introduces Jacob's lawyer, Mr. Loser. When Jacob walks into the court, he is surrounded by screaming adults. The judge sits in front of him and is angry and rude to the boy. He says that offenses such as Jacob's cannot be taken lightly, as they may lead to bigger crimes in the future. Jacob pleads innocent, and the judge tells him that his plea is very inconsiderate because it is a busy court. The jury finds Jacob guilty and sentences him to "…two months, two days, two hours, two minutes in the darkest dungeons of prison."  Suddenly, a voice from the back of the room yells, "I appeal this verdict". Exciting music begins to play and the adults in the room scream, hide, and faint. Child Power enters the room, portrayed by Jacob's siblings, Emma and Noah. They are introduced as "The Intrepid Shapiro" and "The Fearless O’Toole".  The judge is afraid of the two children, and nervously tells them that Jacob's sentence has already been passed. Child Power agrees but remind the judge that cruelty to children is against the law. They warn the judge that if they hear of any cruelty in the prison, then he will be hearing from them. Jacob leaves the court room only to find his siblings waiting for him in his cell. They give him a jewel shaped tracking device, and ask for his help. He promises to contact them if he senses any child cruelty in the prison, and Child Power leaves him in the cell.

Master Fish and Mistress Fowl take Jacob from his cell and lead him to the prison. They have similar faces to the people that Jacob saw when he was in the store. As they walk towards the prison they tell Jacob scary stories and point out the smog and crocodiles that block the way to the prison's island. When Jacob gets to the prison, he is introduced the fearsome warden, The Hooded Fang. The warden reads Jacob's sentence and sends him to the deepest and darkest cell in the prison. The Hooded Fang tells Jacob that he hates children. He says that when he was a wrestler, he was feared by everyone. During one match, a child pointed at him and laughed, telling the audience that the wrestler was not scary – only funny. After this incident, the Hooded Fang was unable to fight, because everyone around him would laugh him out of the stadium. Jacob apologizes to the Hooded Fang after hearing his story, telling him that he seems like a nice man. The warden is furious, as he wants everyone to think of him as mean and scary, and sends Jacob to his cell. As Jacob passes by the other cells, he notices that the children's skin is gray in colour. They beg Master Fish and Mistress Fowl for food, but are given only stale bread and moldy apples. When Jacob reaches his cell, he finds some candy and a note that says, "You have a friend".

Jacob is woken up the next morning by a man in a large fur coat. He introduces himself as Mister Fox, the head guard, and takes Jacob to the shower room to give him his new uniform. When they enter the shower room, Jacob realizes that it is a freezer. After his cold shower, Mister Fox inspects behind Jacob's ears to make sure that he is clean and finds the jewel that Child Power gave him. Mister Fox takes the tracking device from him, thinking that it is a precious jewel. Jacob is then taken to a party in the dining hall. He sees all of the gray children and sits down with them. He asks them why they are gray and they tell him that it is because the smog hides the sun. The Hooded Fang enters the room and all of the children start screaming. Jacob's new friends tell him that he must pretend to be afraid as well, or else the warden will be angry. The Hooded Fang presents Mister Fox with a "Rotten Child Award" and says that he must go to the city and complete some undercover work. He wants Mister Fox to visit toy stores and sabotage all of the toys. Jacob is worried because Mister Fox has the tracking device, and if he leaves the prison, then Child Power will not be able to find the children. Jacob feels that by losing the tracking device, he has failed everyone.

Child Power is alerted that the tracking device has traveled to a toy shop in the city. They decide to go and investigate and find Mister Fox sabotaging the toys. They ask him where he found the jewel, and Mister Fox lies and tells the children that he found it in a fish. Child Power is devastated, because they think that Jacob drowned while trying to escape and was then eaten by a fish. The film then cuts back to the prison, where Jacob is working in the smog making workshop. He tells his friends that he has been receiving many notes with candy attached, telling him to tremble when the Hooded Fang is around.

The Hooded Fang talks to his mother about Jacob. He tells her that no matter what he does he cannot get the small boy to cower or scream in fear. He travels to Jacob's cell and asks him questions in an attempt to break his spirit. He tries to get Jacob to say numbers other than two, but Jacob finds ways around it. Jacob tells the Hooded Fang that "he too can be a two-two", making the retired wrestler more and more frustrated until he eventually threatens to feed Jacob to the sharks.  When Jacob is in the dining hall with his friends, he tells them about a plan for escape. He has written a note for Child Power and thinks that the Hooded Fang will deliver the letter for him.

The Hooded Fang brings Jacob his last meal before he is to be fed to the sharks. He tried to get Jacob to scream, but Jacob says that he knows the warden's secret. Jacob tells him that he knows the Hooded Fang is not evil. He thinks that The Hooded Fang is the one who has been leaving Jacob notes and candy, because they always appear after the warden leaves Jacob's cell. Jacob says that he will hug and kiss him unless they make a deal. After several hugs, the Hooded Fang agrees to deliver the letter for Jacob. Child Power receives the letter and sets out to find Mister Fox. They battle Mister Fox in the toy store, but eventually The Intrepid Shapiro and The Fearless O’Toole get the better of him. They tell him that they will spare him if he promises to take them to the prison. When they reach the water surrounding the island, Child Power poisons the crocodiles. Mister Fox teases Child Power, poking fun at Jacob's size and telling them that he could never actually help. Jacob's siblings stand up for him, telling Mister Fox that Jacob isn’t too small to help. The children in the prison rebel against the guard by destroying the smog machine and blinding the adults with the sun. The only adult that doesn’t cower is the Hooded Fang, because as Jacob predicted, he is just a big kid. The Hooded Fang tries to scare the children, but they only laugh.

When Child Power reaches the prison, Jacob tells them what happened. Child Power points out to Jacob that he is no longer repeating what he says. Jacob realizes that people are finally listening to what he says the first time. All of a sudden, Jacob is woken up by his father. He finds himself still under the play structure in the park where he fell asleep. He gives everyone in his family a hug, and they leave the park holding hands.

Cast
Stephen Rosenberg as Jacob Two-Two: Jacob Two-Two is the film’s main character. He is a cheerful and intelligent boy who has to repeat himself in order to be heard by those around him. Jacob is constantly told by those around him that he is too small to help anyone. In his dream he becomes the protagonist and saves the day despite his size.
Alex Karras as The Hooded Fang: The Hooded Fang is a retired wrestler who desperately wants everyone around him to find him tough and scary. Although his wrestling career ended when a child laughed at him and told his audience that he was not scary, he still wears fanged teeth and a wrestling costume. He is the warden of the children’s prison.
Martha Richler as Emma/The Intrepid Shapiro: Emma is Jacob’s older sister and one of the two members of Child Power!. When she is portraying her Child Power alter ego she goes by the name of "The Intrepid Shapiro". Although she does not believe Jacob is big enough to help in real life, in Jacob’s dream she is one of his supporters. She helps the children escape from their prison.
Thor Bishopric as Noah/The Fearless O'Toole: Noah is the brother of Jacob and Emma, he is another member of Child Power known as "The Fearless O’Toole". Along with his sister, he helps Jacob in his quest to free the children from the prison.
Claude Gai as Mister Fox: Mister Fox is the head guard of the children’s prison. He wears a large fur coat and is cruel and greedy.
Guy L'Écuyer as Master Fish: Master Fish has the face of the man that Jacob saw in the store at the beginning of the film. He has a gravely voice, silver skin, and gills. He is one of the members of the prison guard.
Joy Coghill as Mistress Fowl: Mistress Fowl has the face of the woman that Jacob saw in the store at the beginning of the film. She has red hair, a beak for a nose, and a big bird-like body. She often clucks and walks around awkwardly with her arms bent at her sides. She is one of the members of the prison guard.
Earl Pennington as Mr. Cooper/Judge: Mr. Cooper is the owner of the store in real life, but the Judge in Jacob’s dream. Mr. Cooper teases Jacob’s habit and tells the young boy not to speak that way to an adult. It is clear in Jacob’s dream that the judge, along with the other adults in the courtroom, does not like children.
Yvon Leroux as The Policeman: The Policeman enters the store as Mr. Cooper teases Jacob about his habit. The Policeman joins in on the fun but takes things too far and causes Jacob to run from the store in fear. The Policeman tries to explain to the boy that it was a joke but cannot reach him in time.
Victor Désy as Louis Loser: Mr. Loser is Jacob’s lawyer when he is sent to court. He is clumsy, cowers under a desk in the court room, and has a thick French accent.
Kirsten Bishopric as Marfa: Marfa is Jacob’s eldest sister. She is watching wrestling when Jacob comes to see her in the beginning of the film and warns him that the program is too scary for the young boy.
Walter Massey as Father: Jacob’s father is the only person in the family who lets Jacob help. He sends him to the store to fetch some ice cream.
Jill Frappier as Mother: Jacob’s mother is cooking dinner in the kitchen when Jacob comes to ask if he can help. The two of them discuss Noah’s interpretation of school.
John Wildman as Daniel: Daniel is Jacob’s eldest brother.

Reception

Critical reviews
The Canadian film review site, Canuxploitation, reviewed Jacob Two-Two and the Hooded Fang and concluded that despite several issues, it was "definitely worth a look". The author stated that although they did not enjoy the children's musical numbers or the outdated animatronics, the film's connection to Canadian culture was far superior to that of its 1999 adaption. Although the reviewer enjoyed the introduction of Child Power, he felt that some of the most interesting aspects found in Richler's book were not conveyed as well as they could have been in the film.

Jacob Two-Two Meets the Hooded Fang (1978) was reviewed by a critic on the film review website, Prison Movies. The author provided the movie with 1.5/5 stars, comparing Jacob Two-Two's imagined children's prison from the film, to adult prisons in both other movies and actual prisons in real life. According to the critic, Two-Two's prison is a metaphor for adult incarceration in several ways. The smog that covers the island demonstrates the 'out of sight, out of mind' opinions that the public often holds about prisoners and the penitentiaries in which they live.  The character of Mr. Fox parallels the common motif of a prison guard who enjoys smashing the sense of achievement of inmates through the use of mind games. The author summarizes their opinions of the film by stating that "In some ways, the biggest thing that sets it apart from most adult prison movies is the happy ending."

Author's response
Mordecai Richler, the author of the original book, spoke about the film in an interview for CBC radio. He was not pleased with the outcome of the film, telling the station: "I think it was a very bad job, very very bad job."

See also
 Jacob Two-Two, the series of books upon which the film is based.
 Mordecai Richler, the author of the books upon which the film is based, and the person that the character of Father is based on

 Jacob Two Two Meets the Hooded Fang, the 1999 adaption of Richler's book
 Jacob Two-Two, the 2003-06 television series based on Richler's books

References

External links 
 
 

English-language Canadian films
1978 films
Films shot in Montreal
Films directed by Theodore J. Flicker
Films based on Canadian novels
Films based on works by Mordecai Richler
Canadian children's fantasy films
1970s Canadian films